Peter "The Hurricane" Smit (December 24, 1961 – August 15, 2005) was a Dutch martial artist who mastered such different fight disciplines as kyokushin karate, kickboxing and Muay Thai.

Peter Smit in his prime was one of the best Dutch fighters, who never got enough fights to show his full potential. He had to retire early in his career because of a serious ankle injury.

 Biography 

He starting training in Kyokushin karate when he 16 years old and then in 1981 he commenced training in kickboxing. He fought his first international tournament, the Open Ocean Pacific Kyokushinkai championship, in 1985 on Hawaii. Smit got his nickname "The Hurricane" from a Dutch colleague Fred Royers by "becoming a champion like a hurricane" when he beat six opponents on one day.

In 1986 he fought against Hiroki Kurosawa during the 18th Open Japanese Championships Kyokushinkai in Tokyo. Because of a debatable decision Peter Smit lost this fight after three extra rounds in spite of a broken toe. This fight is known as an example of "true Kyokushinkai Fighting Spirit". Smit trained with Michel Wedel in Japan, and the following year in the Netherlands in preparation for the European Championship. Peter Smit became European Middle weight champion Kyokushin in 1987 in Katowice, Poland.

His fight against Changpuek Kiatsongrit in the Lumpinee Stadium in Bangkok is legendary. Peter Smit knocked out a Thai Champion in front of his own public, the first time that had happened in the history of muay thai. After a flurry of punches and knees Changpuek was knocked out in the 2nd round. Peter Smit became the world muay thai champion.

Peter Smit developed himself as an absolute top fighter in three of the hardest fight sports in the world.

His first fight against kickboxing legend Rob Kaman was also an upset. In the 10th round he won by a knockout, which was considered impossible against the "unbeatable" Kaman at the time. It was the highlight of Peter Smit's short career.

He worked for Fighting Network Rings in Japan a cross MMA-Professioanl Wrestling promotion from 1991 to 1994. 

He was attacked in a Rotterdam nightclub by two guys. The scuffle ended up in the nightclub car park with Peter suffering a broken ankle. His attackers had tried to kill him attempting to run him down with their car. A cast was put on the broken ankle but Peter cut it off with a hacksaw and fought Rob Kaman neglecting the injury. The ankle injury never healed properly and unfortunately he had to end his career.

With his career over he suffered depression and became addicted to cocaine. He ran into trouble with the police committing thefts to support his addiction and ended up serving a 7 month sentence in jail in 2000. He rebuilt his life when he was released from jail, drug free, however, had he difficulties training due to the ankle injury.

On August 15, 2005 he was shot to death in Rotterdam, the Netherlands, after he stood up for his friend., Retrieved 2013-06-03.

Since his death fellow fighter Peter Aerts has worn "Peter Smit RIP" in his fight shorts, Aerts is a fan of Smit's career .

Fight Record

|-  bgcolor="#FFBBBB"
| 1991 || Loss ||align=left| Rob Kaman || AJKF || Bunkyō, Tokyo, Japan || KO  || 8 || 
|-
|-  bgcolor="#FFBBBB"
| 1991-05-26 || Loss ||align=left| Maurice Smith || AJKF "From Budokan-I Chapter III" || Chiyoda, Tokyo, Japan || KO  || 5 || 1:13
|-
|-  bgcolor="#FFBBBB"
| 1991-04-07 || Loss ||align=left| Wade Woodbury ||  || Dordrecht, Netherlands || TKO || 2 || 
|-
! style=background:white colspan=9 |
|-
|-  bgcolor="#FFBBBB"
| 1990-11-27 || Loss ||align=left| Changpuek Kiatsongrit || Lumpinee Stadium || Bangkok, Thailand || Decision || 5 || 3:00
|-
! style=background:white colspan=9 |
|-
|-  bgcolor="#CCFFCC"
| 1990-08-31 || Win ||align=left| Changpuek Kiatsongrit || Lumpinee Stadium || Bangkok, Thailand || KO (Punches) || 2 || 
|-
! style=background:white colspan=9 |
|-
|-  bgcolor="#CCFFCC"
| 1990-06-30 || Win ||align=left| Rob Kaman || AJKF "Inspiring Wars "Heat630"" || Chiyoda, Tokyo, Japan || KO(Right cross) || 10 || 2:10
|-
! style=background:white colspan=9 |
|-
|-  bgcolor="#CCFFCC"
| 1990-04-08 || Win ||align=left| Leo de Snoo ||  || Netherlands ||  ||  || 
|-
! style=background:white colspan=9 |
|-
|-  bgcolor="#FFBBBB"
| 1989-12-17 || Loss || align="left" | Luc Verheye ||  || Dordrecht, Netherlands || TKO (Doctor Stoppage)
|  2
| 3:00
|-
|-  bgcolor="#CCFFCC"
| 1989-10-28 || Win ||align=left| Luc Verheye ||  || Dordrecht, Netherlands || ||  || 
|-  bgcolor="#CCFFCC"
| 1989-05-21 || Win ||align=left|  Kosta Padoulitis ||  ||Dordrecht, Netherlands || Decision  || 5 || 2:00
|-
|-  bgcolor="#CCFFCC"
| 1989-01-29 || Win ||align=left| Andre Mannaart || AJKF || Tokyo, Japan || Decision  || 5 || 3:00
|-
|-
| colspan=9 | Legend'':

Titles 
 Ocean Pacific Champion Kyokushin Karate 1985
 2x Dutch Champion Kyokushin Karate Light heavyweight 1985 and 1986
 Kyokushin Karate lightheavyweight European champion 1987
 WKA Kickboxing World Junior Lightheavyweight champion 1990
 Das Führer's Street Fighter champion 1990
 IMF World champion Muay Thai 1990
 WKA Lightheavyweight European Champion kickboxing 1990

See also
List of male kickboxers
kyokushin karate

References

External links
Shoot Boxing Official Site

1961 births
2005 deaths
Dutch male kickboxers
Light heavyweight kickboxers
Dutch male karateka
Dutch Muay Thai practitioners
Kyokushin kaikan practitioners
Sportspeople from Dordrecht
Male murder victims
Dutch murder victims
People murdered in the Netherlands
Deaths by firearm in the Netherlands